Spanish bayonet or Spanish dagger is a common name for several plants and may refer to:

Hesperoyucca whipplei — Southern California, United States and Baja California, Mexico.
Yucca aloifolia — Southeastern U.S, Mexico, Caribbean.
Yucca faxoniana —  Chihuahuan Desert region of northern Mexico and Southwestern U.S.
Yucca gloriosa — Southeastern U.S.
Yucca harrimaniae — Rocky Mountains and Great Basin of the Southwestern U.S.
Yucca schidigera — Mojave Desert and Sonoran Desert regions of Southwestern U.S. and northern Mexico.
Yucca treculeana — Texas, New Mexico, Coahuila

See also
Adam's needle